Jeyhunabad, also rendered as Jehunabad, may refer to:
 Jeyhunabad, Hamadan (جيهون اباد - Jeyhūnābād)
 Jeyhunabad, Kermanshah (جيحون اباد - Jeyḩūnābād)